Acacia barattensis, commonly known as Baratta wattle, is a shrub of the genus Acacia and the subgenus Plurinerves that is endemic to a small area in South Australia where the species is considered to be rare.

Description
It has slender branchlets that are often coated in a black powdery substance. Like most species of Acacia it has phyllodes rather than true leaves. The slender and erect phyllodes have a narrowly linear shape and are  usually shallowly incurved. It blooms between April and December producing simple and axillary inflorescences with spherical pale yellow coloured flower-heads. Following flowering dark brown seed pods form that are 
flat and straight with thick straw coloured margins.

Taxonomy
The shrub was first formally described by the botanist John McConnell Black in 1932 as part of the work Additions to the Flora of South Australia. No. 30 as published in the Transactions and proceedings of the Royal Society of South Australia. It was reclassified as Racosperma barattense by Leslie Pedley in 2003 then returned to genus Acacia in 2006.<ref>{{cite web|url=https://bie.ala.org.au/species/https://id.biodiversity.org.au/node/apni/2905743#names|title=Acacia barattensis J.M.Black Baratta Wattle|accessdate=10 October 2020|work=Atlas of Living Australia|publisher=Global Biodiversity Information Facility}}</ref>
It belongs to the Acacia wilhelmiana group. The specific epithet is taken from the name Baratta Station, the pastoral lease where the type specimen was collected from.

Distribution
It has a limited distribution in the Flinders Range of South Australia and is considered to be a rare species which was previously thought to be extinct. It is commonly situated among outcropping areas of quartzite along the lines of watercourses and on the slopes of rocky gulleys growing in skeletal soils in open woodland or shrubland communities often in association with Eucalyptus camaldulensis , Eucalyptus flindersii and Callitris glaucophylla''.

See also
 List of Acacia species

References

barattensis
Flora of South Australia
Plants described in 1932
Taxa named by John McConnell Black